Gallarus Castle is a four-storey rectangular tower house in Baile na nGall, County Kerry, Ireland and is notable as one of the few fortified structures preserved on the Dingle Peninsula.

History 
Gallarus Castle was built in the 15th century by the Knight of Kerry, the holder of a hereditary knighthood belonging to the Geraldine Dynasty. It is now an Irish heritage site.

The building has been extensively restored and a new rectangular doorway inserted in the north wall. There is no evidence of a stone stairway below the second floor. A mural stairway rises in the east wall and the ceilings on the third and fourth floor are vaulted.

References

Sources 
 – D to M (for Gallerus)

Castles in County Kerry
National Monuments in County Kerry